Club Atlético River Plate is a professional Argentine sports club based in the Nuñez neighborhood of Buenos Aires. The football team is one of the most successful of Argentina, having won the Primera División professional title a record 36 times. The club has also won 8 National cups.

At international level, River Plate has won 16 international titles, with 11 titles recognised by FIFA and CONMEBOL, including the Copa Libertadores, Copa Intercontinental and Copa Sudamericana. Other international official titles include Rioplatenses competitions Copa Aldao and Tie Cup.

The beginning

River Plate was founded on 25 May 1901 , close to the La Boca neighborhood (later the home of fierce rivals Boca Juniors). The institution was formed since the merge of two clubs, "Santa Rosa" and "La Rosales", with Leopoldo Bard being elected as its first president. The name was chosen because of an incident during the construction of Buenos Aires Port: one of the members had seen how the workers of Dique 3 left their duties for a while to play a football match. The boxes they were working with just said "The River Plate" (the name the English gave to the Río de la Plata) and that 'enigmatic' inscription was taken to name the new club.

Club's first field was located on Dársena Sud of the Port of Buenos Aires, just behind the "Wilson" coal stores. Members and Wilson managers made their contributions, including the goals and perimeter fences. When the works finished, River requested affiliation to the Argentine Football Association, which was granted. The team debuted in the third division in 1905 playing against Facultad de Medicina, being defeated by 3–2.

Despite the efforts made by club members and other collaborators to build the first stadium, the Minister of Agriculture of Argentina ordered the deviction of the land where it stayed, so in 1906 the club had to leave it. José Bernasconi, director of Naval storages "Dresco", gave the club a land located near small bridge of Sarandí in Greater Buenos Aires, therefore River Plate moved there to play its home games. The club remained there just a year so in 1907 members Bernardo Messina and Enrique Zanni proposed to return to the same field in Dársena Sud because the field had not been replaced by the Government. As a result, River Plate returned to its first field, where some years after a grandstand would be built to host the increasing supporters that follow the team.

First titles

In 1906 River Plate registered a team to play in the second division, where it finished 6th of section B. The team had a much better campaign in the 1907 season, where it finished 1st of section A but lost the title (and therefore the promotion to the first division) to Nacional (a club from Floresta) by 1–0 at Ferro Carril Oeste stadium.

After one season playing in Sarandí, in 1908 River returned to its field in Dársena Sur, where the squad played all its home games of the season. Once the regular season ended, the four best placed teams qualified to play for the promotion to Primera División. In the semifinals, River Plate defeated Ferro Carril Oeste by 5–1 while Racing Club beat Boca Juniors by 2–1.

The final was played on December 13, 1908 at GEBA Stadium, where River defeated Racing by 2–1 after extra time. However, the match was declared null due to River supporters jumped onto the field to celebrate with the players, so a new match had to be played. In the second game (held on December 27), River Plate defeated Racing again with a shattering 7–0, therefore promoting to Primera División. The line-up for that game was Luraschi; Chiappe, Politano; Messina, Morroni, Chagneaud; Anempodisto García, Griffero, Abaca Gómez, Elías Fernández, Priano.

River debuted in the first division on 2 May 1909, against Argentino de Quilmes. Some highlights of that season was a 1–0 victory over legendary Alumni and a catastrophic 1–10 against Belgrano Athletic. With the arriving to the top division, River Plate started to wear a jersey in red, white and black vertical stripes instead of the white with a red sash band that had been wearing still then.

The first year in the top level division, River finished 2nd to Alumni with 11 games won, 2 drew and 5 lost. Those were the years where teams such as Alumni (until its dissolution in 1911) and Racing Club dominated Argentine football, winning all the championship disputed.

In 1914 River won its first domestic championship, the Copa de Competencia Jockey Club after beating Newell's Old Boys by 4–0 at the final, also finishing unbeaten. River also won its first international title, the Tie Cup against Uruguayan team Bristol F.C. The line-up for that final was: Isola; Chiappe, Lanata; Peruzzi, Cándido García, Alfredo Elli; Fraga Patrao, Martín, Penney, Gianetto, Sevesi.

The first Primera División title won by River in 1920 came after the 7-consecutive championships won by Racing Club. Nevertheless, the team from Avellaneda made a great campaign finishing 2nd.

In 1923, River moved to a new stadium in the Recoleta district of Buenos Aires. The stadium was placed in Alvear avenue and Tagle. River had previously signed a contract with the Buenos Aires and Pacific Railway, owners of the land, for a term of 5 years. It stipulated a monthly rent of $ 500. The club continued renting the land through successive contracts until 1935 when River Plate signed the last for a term of 2 years. The amount had increased to $3.500 by then. Architects Bernardo Messina and Juan Vaggo led the construction of the stadium. The club would play its home games in Alvear y Tagle until 1938.

1931–39: "Los Millonarios"

With the establishment of the professionalism in 1931, River Plate acquired right wing Carlos Peucelle in 1931 for $10,000 and Bernabé Ferreyra for $35,000 (huge amounts of money in those years) in 1932. Because of that, River was nicknamed "Los Millonarios" ("The Millionaires"), which has remained since. Ferreyra was the top scorer with 43 goals. River and Independiente finished in the first position so both teams had to have a play-off match in order to declare a champion. River defeated Independiente 3–0 obtaining its second title in the top division of Argentine football.

River not only won its second league title in 1932 but the Copa de Competencia, a national cup organized by dissident "Liga Argentina de Football", defeating Estudiantes de La Plata by 3–1. That was also the year when the team returned to the historic red sash uniform, at the instigation of club's president Antonio Liberti.

River obtained two championships in the 1936 season, the "Copa Campeonato" (regular season) and the "Copa de Oro" after defeating San Lorenzo in the final game. That same year River Plate won its first Copa Aldao (played between the Argentine and Uruguay champions) after thrashing Peñarol by 5–1 in Montevideo.

The following year River won the league title again, totalling 58 points in 34 matches, having scored 106 goals and only conceding 43. José Manuel Moreno was the top scorer with 37 goals. Other notable players were Adolfo Pedernera, Renato Cesarini and José María Minella. The team not only won the league but the Copa Aldao, defeating Peñarol again by 5–2 in Estadio Gasómetro of Buenos Aires. That same year the club also won the Copa Ibarguren in 1937, with a large victory of 5–0 over Rosario Central at Estadio Gasómetro.

On 25 May 1938, the Estadio Monumental is officially opened, with a match between River and Peñarol, which River won 3–1.

1940s: "La Máquina"

The decade of the 1940s is considered as one of the best eras in the history of the club, having won the league titles of 1941 (44 points, 19 wins, 6 draws and 5 losses; 75 goals scored) and 1942 (46 points, 20–6–4, 79 goals), national cups Carlos Ibarguren (1941–42) and Adrián Escobar (1941) and the international Copa Aldao in 1941, 1945 and 1947.

1941 was one of the most successful years in club's history, so River Plate won four titles, the local championship, its third Copa Aldao defining the series against Nacional in two matches (with a thrashing 6–1 in the first game) and the Copa Ibarguren defeating Newell's Old Boys by 3–0 and the Copa Adrián C. Escobar beating Huracán. Four years later, River won two titles else, the 1945 league championship and another Copa Aldao defeating Peñarol for the third consecutive time (the squad won both games, in Montevideo and Buenos Aires).

River would win its third Copa Ibarguren the following year, thrashing a Córdoba Province representative team by 7–0 in the final game.

The team was also sub-champion in 1943 and 1944. River had a powerful attack nicknamed "La Máquina" ("The Machine"). The forwards were Juan Carlos Muñoz, José Manuel Moreno, Adolfo Pedernera, Ángel Labruna and Félix Loustau. That offensive line became a legend despite only playing 18 matches together. In 1945 River won another title, with Labruna being the top scorer with 25 goals. Moreno had left the club but other players (such as center-midfielder Néstor Rossi) had arrived.

In 1947 River won a new league championship with 48 points, totaling 90 goals scored and only conceding 30. Some emerging players were goalkeeper Amadeo Carrizo and center-forward Alfredo Di Stéfano, which came from the youth categories. Di Stéfano was River top-scorer with 27 goals. The squad also won its 5th. Copa Aldao after defeating Nacional at the finals.

After a footballers strike in 1948 many footballers went to Colombia, "Pipo" Rossi and Di Stefano were among them. River finished the 1948 and 1949 tournaments in 2nd position.

1950s: First treble

River went to a European tour in 1951 and the next year the team crowned champion. River totalized 40 points, with 17 matches won, 6 draws and 7 losses. That team was nicknamed "La Máquina" ("The Machine") and had Labruna, Uruguayan Walter Gómez, Santiago Vernazza, Eliseo Prado, Lousteau and goalkeeper Carrizo as some of its most relevant players. In 1953 River won another title, with 60 goals scored and only conceding 36.

With the addition of "Pipo" Rossi (returned from Millonarios of Colombia), Federico Vairo (traded from Rosario Central) and the rise of Enrique Omar Sívori from the youth categories River won the 1955, 1956 and 1957 titles consecutively for the first time in the history of the club. River Plate would also win its sixth Copa Aldao in 1955 against Nacional, achieving a record for the tournament so this was the last year it was held.

After the 1957 South American Championship held in Lima, Peru, Sívori was acquired by Juventus F.C. paying $10 million. That amount of money was used by the club to finish the Estadio Monumental grandstands.

After the demise of the Argentina national team in the 1958 World Cup (where Labruna also played with #10 replacing Sívori) River would spend a long time without obtaining any title. On 12 October 1959, Angel Labruna retired from football at the age of 41. Labruna is still the all-time Argentine football top scorer (along with Independiente forward Arsenio Erico with 293 goals over 514 matches played). Moreover, Labruna was one of the greatest idols in River Plate's history.

The 1960s: a decade without titles

River could not win any championship during the 1960s, although the team had many talented players such as Ermindo Onega, José Ramos Delgado, scorer Luis Artime, Vladislao Cap and Oscar Más. This is considered the worst club's age ever, which would last until 1975, totalizing 18 years with no titles for the club.

River's best position during those years was the 2nd place. In 1962 the team lost the title at the hands of arch-rival Boca Juniors, with the famous penalty-shot stopped by Antonio Roma to Delem. Another chance lost was in 1968 when Vélez Sársfield finally got the championship in a mini-tournament organised in order to declare a champion (due to River, Vélez and Racing finished in equal first position at the end of the season). Another domestic title lost was the 1969 final against Chacarita Juniors, which beat River 4–1. River had left behind Boca Juniors in the semifinals by goal average after a 0–0 draw.

In 1966 River played the Copa Libertadores final against Uruguayan team Peñarol. River had finished the first half leading 2–0, but Peñarol scored two goals in the 2nd half so an extra time had to be played. Peñarol scored two goals more winning 4–2 and becoming the new South American champion. The team's performance in that match originated the pejorative nickname Gallinas ("Chicken") which has been used by rivals to refer to River's players and supporters and has remained since.

1970s: Return to greatness

In 1975 Angel Labruna became the team's coach. Under his command, River won a championship after 18 years without obtaining any title (in fact, River won two titles: 1975 Metropolitano and Nacional tournaments). Some of the most important players of that squad were goalkeeper Ubaldo Fillol, backs Roberto Perfumo and Daniel Passarella, midfielders Juan José López, Reinaldo "Mostaza" Merlo and Norberto Alonso and strikers Carlos Morete and Oscar Más.

In 1976 River reached the Copa Libertadores finals, where the squad faced Brazilian team Cruzeiro. After two matches ended with a victory per team, a third game had to be played in Santiago, Chile, and Cruzeiro beat River by 3–2.

River Plate also won the 1977 Metropolitano championship, with the same player structure than earlier years with the addition of striker Leopoldo Luque and left wing Oscar Ortiz. For the 1978 World Cup hosted in Argentina, River gave 5 players to the national team that would win the championship: Fillol, Luque, Passarella, Ortiz and Alonso.

In 1979 River achieved another treble, when winning the 1979 Metropolitano and Nacional and the 1980 Metropolitano tournaments. Some notable players during those seasons were Fillol, Alberto Tarantini, Luque, and Emilio Commisso.

Angel Labruna was not only River's all-time top scorer but he won 6 titles as coach of the first division team.

1980s: First Copa Libertadores

By 1981 Alfredo Di Stéfano replaced Labruna as the coach, Boca Juniors acquired Diego Maradona, which caused a huge impact in Argentine football. To mitigate the effects of Boca's signing of Maradona, River hired national team top scorer and superstar Mario Kempes, apart from other players such as defender Julio Olarticoechea and Américo Gallego. With the addition of those players and based on a strong defensive line and an effective offensive with Kempes and a youth Ramón Díaz, River became 1981 Torneo Nacional champion, defeating Ferro Carril Oeste in the finals with the same score in both matches: 1–0. Norberto Alonso, one of the greatest idols in the history of the club, did not take part of the first team because he had left behind by Di Stefano.

In 1982 some of River players that had contributed to the recent championship, left the club: Alonso was traded to Vélez Sarsfield due to his conflicts with Di Stefano and Kempes returned to Valencia CF. Moreover, Ramón Díaz and Daniel Passarella were sold to Napoli and Fiorentina respectively. River Plate was eliminated from the Copa Libertadores at the hands of Flamengo and Peñarol (which would be the champion). In 1983 Fillol left the club because of an economic conflict with the institution.

With the sale of Alonso, River acquired Uruguayan midfielder Enzo Francescoli to replace him as playmaker. 1983 would be one of the worst in club's history, finishing 18th of 19. Rules indicated that the two teams that finished the season in the last position would be relegated to Primera B, but a restructure of the Argentine football league system introduced at the beginning of the season saved River from being relegated to the second division.

In 1984 Héctor Veira was hired as coach, with River finishing as the runner-up of the 1984 Torneo Nacional losing the final against Ferro Carril Oeste. In 1985 there was a restructure of the league system, and a new tournament was created, with a format similar to the European system. River won the first tournament, the 1985–86, being declared champion six games before the end of the season. The team won 23 games, with 10 draws and only 3 losses. Enzo Francescoli was the top-scorer.

In 1986 River won its first Copa Libertadores, defeating América de Cali in the finals (2–1 in Cali and 1–0 in Buenos Aires). River achieved its second international title, obtaining the Intercontinental Cup against Steaua București, which beat 1–0 in Tokyo. The team would close its most successful era in club's history winning the 1986 Copa Interamericana (played in 1987) against Costa Rica's L.D. Alajuelense. After Veira's departure, River appointed Carlos Griguol for the 1987–88 season, and César Menotti for the  1988–89 season as coaches. Although River acquired many renowned players such as Ángel Comizzo, Omar Palma, Claudio Borghi, Abel Balbo, Jorge da Silva and Daniel Passarella (who had returned from Italy), the team did not make a good performance.

Decade of 1990s: the success continues

In 1990 Daniel Passarella is named coach, winning the 1989–90 tournament and reaching the Copa Libertadores semi-finals, being eliminated against Barcelona de Guayaquil. 1991 was the year which started the longest period of no victories against Boca Juniors: 13 matches. That year Ramón Díaz returned to the club, after his career in Europe, and River obtained the 1991 Apertura with Díaz as top scorer with 14 goals.

But Ramón Díaz emigrated again (this time to Yokohama Marinos) in 1993, nevertheless River won the 1993 Apertura with a team formed by youth promises such as Ariel Ortega, Marcelo Gallardo and Hernán Crespo.

In 1994 Enzo Francescoli returned to the club, winning another title that year with River Plate (the 1994 Apertura), along with Roberto Ayala and goalkeeper Germán Burgos (both acquired to Ferro) and being coached by former player Américo Gallego. River also remained unbeaten that season, for the first time in club's history.

After the brief Carlos Babington's run as coach, Ramón Díaz came to be his replacement in 1995. The following year River won its second Copa Libertadores, defeating América de Cali in the finals again ten years after. América won the first game 1–0 but River overcome 2–0 in Buenos Aires, winning the Cup by goal average. Hernán Crespo scored the two goals in the decisive match.

River would later win its third treble, obtaining the 1996 Apertura and 1997 Clausura and the 1997 Apertura. Internationally, River won (also for the first time in club's history) the 1997 Supercopa Sudamericana defeating São Paulo in the finals, with great performances of Marcelo Salas and Marcelo Gallardo. After the three championships and the Supercopa, Enzo Francéscoli retires, and River would overcome his missing two years later. The 1996/1997 River Plate team is considered among the best teams in South American football history, with stars like Francéscoli, Salas, Julio Cruz, Ariel Ortega, Marcelo Gallardo, Juan Pablo Sorín, Germán Burgos, Celso Ayala, Matías Almeyda, Sergio Berti or Santiago Solari.

In 1999 River won the last title under the coaching of Ramón Díaz, the Apertura tournament, with Javier Saviola as top-scorer with 15 goals. Saviola is also the youngest player to debut for River Plate, playing at the age of 16. Pablo Aimar also was a key player and vital playmaker.

That same year, Argentine sports magazine El Gráfico #4172 named River Plate as "Champions of the Century" ("Campeón Del Siglo"), noting the club's achievements, especially its then 30 Primera División titles against Boca Juniors' 24 and Independiente's 15.

Decade of 2000s: ups and downs
On 25 May 2001 River Plate celebrated its 100 years of existence with a march, called "Monumental Caravan" and a friendly match against Peñarol of Uruguay. This was a year without a title for River, being eliminated in the quarter-finals of the Libertadores against Cruz Azul of Mexico. That year were transferred Pablo Aimar and Javier Saviola to Valencia and Barcelona respectively.

In 2002, Ramón Díaz returned to the club to replace Gallego as coach. River also brought back Ariel Ortega and promoted to Primera youthful players such as Andrés D'Alessandro and Fernando Cavenaghi, winning the Clausura tournament and getting his seventh title with Ramón Díaz as coach, which included a 3:0 victory against Boca at the Bombonera. Ramón Díaz left River at the end of that year due to differences between him and the President José María Aguilar.

In 2003 River won the Clausura tournament, led by Chilean coach Manuel Pellegrini and a team of players like Leonardo Astrada (who retired at the end of the tournament), D'Alessandro, Fernando Cavenaghi, Javier Mascherano and Martín Demichelis.

In 2004, with Leonardo Astrada as manager, River achieved the Clausura tournament, this was its thirty-second domestic championship. The team also returned to the semi-finals of Copa Libertadores facing Boca Juniors. Boca won 1–0 the first game, where there were incidents between players from both clubs, and River won 2–1 in the Monumental although the team left out in the penalty shootout. After the Copa América and Olympic Games (where Argentina national team won its first gold medal with Mascherano and Lucho González as part of the team), River sold most of its figures, so Cavenaghi, Lucho González, Javier Mascherano, Marcelo Salas and Maximiliano López left the club that same year.

In 2008, Diego Simeone was appointed manager of the club, in his first season he led them to their first league title in four years, winning the Clausura championship. The following season the club suffered a poor run of form resulting in Simeone's resignation mid-season. The club went on to finish in last place in the Apertura 2008, the first time River had ever finished bottom of a league in 107 years.

2011 relegation: starting all over

In 2011, River Plate was facing both an institutional and sports crisis. José María Aguilar left the presidency of the club with a debt of over 75 million dollars, being replaced by Daniel Passarella. The team ended the 2008 Apertura tournament at the bottom of the table, and River's poor form followed through the 2011 Clausura tournament. As a result, River played the Promoción, a two-legged play-off against Belgrano de Córdoba, the fourth placed team of the 2010–11 Primera B Nacional. Belgrano won the first leg 2–0 at Córdoba, and held on for a 1–1 draw at El Monumental. With the defeat, River Plate was relegated to Nacional B for the first time in its history. The second match was interrupted during injury time by rioting in the stadium and its surroundings which continued after the match was called, despite a substantial police presence. Almost immediately following River's relegation, Juan José López resigned as manager.

Back to Primera División
Almeyda retired as player when River was relegated to become the team's coach, while Fernando Cavenaghi and Alejandro Domínguez returned to the club to play at the second division. In January 2012, David Trezeguet and Leonardo Ponzio arrived to the club to play the second half of Nacional. In June 2012, River won the title after defeating Almirante Brown by 2–0 in the last fixture and therefore returned to Primera División to play the 2012–13 season. Just a week later, the reserve team of River coached by Cesar Laraignee won the U-20 Copa Libertadores in Lima, Perú, after defeating Defensor Sporting of Uruguay 1–0 in the final.

After some conflicts with the President, manager Matías Almeyda was eventually fired by the club on 28 November 2012, only two rounds before the end of the Torneo Inicial. The following day it was announced that Ramón Díaz would become River's coach for third time in history.

Success after the dark years

On 18 May 2014, River won their 36th national league title when the team clinched the 2014 Torneo Final, beating Quilmes by 5–0. A week later River won the 2013–14 Superfinal against 2013 Torneo Inicial champion, San Lorenzo de Almagro. Ramón Díaz immediately resigned and left River amid the celebrations for both championships. Several days later it was confirmed that Marcelo Gallardo would be the new coach for River. His team was highly praised during the beginnings of the semester due to the good level of its game style, but competing in three different tournaments took its toll.

However, the first team won its first CONMEBOL tournament in 17 years on December 10, the 2014 Copa Sudamericana. River Plate beat Colombian team Atlético Nacional at the finals, winning 3–1 on aggregate (1–1 on the first leg away and 2–0 on the second leg at home). Previously, River Plate had beaten Godoy Cruz, Club Libertad, Estudiantes (LP) and arch-rival Boca Juniors.

As 2014 Copa Sudamericana champions, River contested the 2015 Recopa Sudamericana against 2014 Copa Libertadores champions San Lorenzo. They won both legs 1–0 to win their first Recopa Sudamericana. River went on an unbeaten streak in the 2015 Argentine Primera División first 10 matches that ended in a 2–0 loss to Boca Juniors at La Bombonera. Also, they competed in the 2014-15 Copa Argentina and they were knocked out 0–2 by Rosario Central in the round of 32. Meanwhile, River started their 2015 Copa Libertadores campaign in a poor way, with a 2–0 away defeat to Bolivian side San José. Next, they played UANL from Mexico at El Monumental to a 1–1 draw. Consequently, they met Peruvian club Juan Aurich and drew 1–1 both away and at home, thus putting their qualification hopes in danger.  After trailing 2–0 to UANL in Mexico, River produced a remarkable comeback in the last 5 minutes to earn a 2–2 draw and stay alive in the competition. In their last group stage match, they defeated San José 3–0 at home, while simultaneously UANL visited and beat Juan Aurich 5–4, thus River advanced to the knockout stage (Juan Aurich had a 2-point advantage over River before the last matchday).

As the worst second-placed team in the group stage, River were drawn with Boca Juniors, the best group-winners, in the round of 16. River beat Boca 1–0 in the first leg at El Monumental. In the second leg at La Bombonera, River players were attacked with pepper spray while returning to the field at halftime. The match was suspended with a 0–0 score, and Boca were disqualified from the tournament. River met Brazilian side Cruzeiro in the quarterfinals, losing 0–1 in at home, but ultimately advancing to the semifinals for the first time in 9 years after a 3–0 away victory. They played Guaraní from Paraguay, winning 2–0 at home and drawing 1–1 away, hence qualifying for their first Copa Libertadores finals since 1996. River Plate won the final and the 2015 Copa Libertadores after defeating Tigres UANL by 3–0. Meanwhile, River's domestical form dropped, with 3 draws and 6 losses on their last 12 matches, and eventually finished in ninth place.

On November 11, 2018, River drew 2–2 with Boca Juniors in the first leg of the 2018 Copa Libertadores final, before winning the second leg 3–1 at the Santiago Bernabéu, home of Real Madrid, to win the competition for the fourth time.

Notes

References

Club Atlético River Plate
R
R